"Vivons pour demain" is the third single from French singer Leslie's album, Mes Couleurs.

Track listing
"Vivons pour demain" [inédit]  - radio edit
"Nos Colères"

Charts

References

2004 songs
Leslie (singer) songs
2005 singles
Songs written by Skalp
Songs written by Leslie (singer)
Songs written by Kore (producer)